Pedro Felipe Da Cruz Felício Santos (born 9 May 1980) is a Portuguese former football manager.

Career
Santos started his career with Portuguese third tier side Pinhalnovense. In 2018, he was appointed manager of América de Cali in the Colombian top flight.

References

External links
 

1980 births
Living people
Portuguese football managers